The Brecknock Hill Cheviot (also known as Brecon Cheviot and Sennybridge Cheviot) is a domesticated breed of sheep having its origin approximately 400 years ago from Wales.  They are a result of crosses with the Welsh Mountain, the Cheviot and the Leicester breeds.  This breed is primarily raised for meat.  It was introduced into the US in 1838.

Characteristics 
Brecknock Hill Cheviot have erect ears with white face and legs and a ruff of wool behind the ears. There is no wool on the face or legs below the knee or hock. Both sexes are polled (hornless)  However, the rams are occasionally horned.

The spinning count of the wool is 50's to 56's. The fleece has some shades of kemp but not generally red. In the UK, the wool is used mainly for tweeds and knitwear. Mature ewes weigh  and mature rams .

References

External links 
Miniature Cheviot Sheep Breeders Cooperative- United States 

Sheep breeds
Sheep breeds originating in Wales